Cross Purposes Live is a boxed set released by the English heavy metal band Black Sabbath in March 1995. The set comprised a live album on CD and a VHS tape of a concert recorded at the Hammersmith Apollo in London on Wednesday 13 April 1994, recorded on the band's tour for their Cross Purposes album. The tour was notable for being the first time The Wizard had been played since early 1971, when Ozzy Osbourne was still lead vocalist. It is Black Sabbath's only live album with singer Tony Martin. The CD was housed within an oversized videotape case but had its own inserts and jewel case.

Both the original CD and VHS tape are out of print, but an hour long unlicensed DVD was released with nine of the sixteen original video tracks. This release includes the promo videoclip of "Feels Good to Me", from 1990's Tyr.

Track listings

Personnel
Tony Martin – vocals
Tony Iommi – guitars
Geezer Butler – bass
Geoff Nicholls – keyboards
Bobby Rondinelli – drums

See also

References

Black Sabbath live albums
1995 live albums
Live video albums
1995 video albums
Black Sabbath video albums
I.R.S. Records live albums
Albums recorded at the Hammersmith Apollo